Aarne Hermlin (6 June 1940, Võru, Estonia – 17 November 2007, Salo) was an Estonian chess player who won the Estonian Chess Championship. He was awarded the title of International Correspondence Chess Master in 1986 and of FIDE Master in 1992.

Biography
In 1958 Aarne Hermlin graduated from secondary school in Jõgeva. He started playing chess under the influence of his father Kaarel Hermlin (1905-1960), who was a chess coach in Jõgeva. In 1956 and 1957 Aarne Hermlin twice won Estonian junior chess championship. In 1968 he shared 2nd place in the Baltic Chess Championship. In 1975 he shared 1st place with Viktor Kupreichik at a strong chess tournament in Pärnu.  He won the gold medal at the Estonian Chess Championships in 1968, silver in 1981 and bronze twice, in 1965 and 1984.   He was also an active correspondence chess player, becoming an ICCF International Master. He died during a chess tournament in Finland in 2007.

References

External links

Aarne Hermlin player profile at OlimpBase.org (Soviet Team Chess Championship)
Aarne Hermlin player profile at OlimpBase.org (Soviet Team Chess Cup)

1940 births
2007 deaths
Estonian chess players
Soviet chess players
Chess FIDE Masters
Sportspeople from Võru
20th-century chess players